Evangelical Cemetery is a former cemetery that was used mainly by German Protestants in Prague from 1795 to the end of the Second World War.

History
The cemetery is thought to have been started around 1795 although the oldest legible gravestone dates from 1828. The cemetery was officially closed in 1950, but it had been effectively closed since 1945.

In 1955 the chapel at the cemetery was given to the Czech Hussite Church. Three years later there was a failed plan to re-use the ground for sports and for public recreation.

In 1998 there were over 600 tombs.

In 2000 it was announced that soldiers of the German Wehrmacht were to be re-buried here from an existing common grave.

Notable burials
The opera singer Wilhelm Elsner, the railway engineer August Gröbe, the composer Ludwig Grünberger and Dr. Hugo Rex are buried here.

References

18th-century establishments in Bohemia
1795 establishments in the Habsburg monarchy
Cemeteries in Prague
Prague 10